

Champions

Major League Baseball
World Series: Detroit Tigers over Chicago Cubs (4-3)
All-Star Game cancelled due to flight restrictions. However, inter-league games were played during the All-Star break.

Other champions
Amateur World Series: Venezuela
Negro League World Series: Cleveland Buckeyes over Homestead Grays (4-0)
Negro League Baseball All-Star Game: West, 9-6
All-American Girls Professional Baseball League: Rockford Peaches

Awards and honors
Baseball Hall of Fame
Roger Bresnahan
Dan Brouthers
Fred Clarke
Jimmy Collins
Ed Delahanty
Hugh Duffy
Hughie Jennings
King Kelly
Jim O'Rourke
Wilbert Robinson
Most Valuable Player
Hal Newhouser (AL) – P, Detroit Tigers
Phil Cavarretta (NL) – 1B, Chicago Cubs
The Sporting News Player of the Year Award
Hal Newhouser – P, Detroit Tigers
The Sporting News Most Valuable Player Award
Eddie Mayo (AL) – 2B, Detroit Tigers
Tommy Holmes (NL) – OF, Boston Braves
The Sporting News Pitcher of the Year Award
Hal Newhouser (AL) – Detroit Tigers
Hank Borowy (NL) – Chicago Cubs
The Sporting News Manager of the Year Award
Ossie Bluege – Washington Senators

MLB statistical leaders

Major league baseball final standings

American League final standings

National League final standings

Negro league baseball final standings

Negro American League final standings

Negro National League final standings

Events

January–July
January 25 - Dan Topping, along with Del Webb and Larry MacPhail purchase a majority control of ownership of the New York Yankees from the estate of Col. Ruppert for $2.8 million. The trio would later purchase the remaining 3.12% in March 1945, with Webb and Topping buying out MacPhail after a few years. 
March 6 - Harry O'Neill, who appeared in one game for the Philadelphia A's in 1939, is killed in the battle for Iwo Jima. 
April 7 - Pitcher Terris McDuffie and infielder Dave Thomas partake in a special tryout for the Brooklyn Dodgers. What made the tryout unique was that both players were black. 
April 17 – Amputee Pete Gray makes his major league debut with the St. Louis Browns.
April 24 - Happy Chandler is selected by the owners to replace Kenesaw Mountain Landis as commissioner of baseball. Landis died after being elected to a new seven-year term. Chandler agrees to fulfil his term in the U.S. Senate, which overlapped his first six months in office.  
May 3 - The New York Yankees released outfielder Paul Waner after just one game. Waner had come out of retirement the previous season due to a shortage of players because of World War II.  
May 17 – For the fourth time in four days, every American League game was postponed due to rain.
May 21 - The Brooklyn Dodgers released Leo Durocher.
May 25 - In the Boston Red Sox 5–0 home loss to the St. Louis Browns, outfielder Leon Culberson of the Red Sox makes an unassisted double play. Culberson raced from center field to catch a short fly ball. He then ran to second and stepped on the bag and doubled up Vern Stephens of the Browns.
July 1 - Hank Greenberg makes his return to the major leagues. Greenberg had been one of the first players to register for the peacetime draft. In his return after forty-seven months away from the majors, Greenberg hits a home run, helping the Detroit Tigers beat the Philadelphia A's 9–5. 
July 3 - Stan Hack, Phil Cavarretta and Don Johnson of the Chicago Cubs each scored five runs apiece, trying a major league record. The Cubs went on to defeat the Boston Braves 24–2. 
July 4 - Augie Bergamo of the St. Louis Cardinals gets eight heads in a double header versus the New York Giants. In the second game alone, Bergamo in the second game got five of his eight hits. In the second game he hit three singles, a two run home run, and a grand slam. In all, Bergamo totaled 11 bases on the day as the Cardinals swept the Giants. 
July 5 - Whitey Lockman hits a home run in his first major league at bat. In the game matching the Giants versus the Cardinals, Lockman hits his home run off Cardinals pitcher George Dockins, but the Giants end up losing 7–5. 
July 6 - Tommy Holmes of the Boston Braves passes Rogers Hornsby in hitting in his 34th consecutive game. Hornsby's record had stood since 1922. Holmes record would stand until 1978 when it is broken by Pete Rose of the Cincinnati Reds. Holmes streak would end six days later. 
July 21 – The Detroit Tigers and Philadelphia A's battle for 24 innings, ending the game tied at one. Tigers starter Les Mueller pitches 19.2 innings, while his A's counterpart, Russ Christopher, lasts thirteen.

August–September
August 1 – Mel Ott hits the 500th home run of his major league career.
August 4
World War II amputee Bert Shepard pitches in a game for the Washington Senators.
Tom McBride of the Boston Red Sox ties a major league record with 6 RBI in the 4th inning of a game with the Washington Senators.
Senators pitcher Joe Cleary becomes the last native of Ireland as of today to appear in a major league game.
Bill Salkeld, a catcher for the Pittsburgh Pirates, hits for the cycle and drives in all of Pittsburgh's runs in their 6–5 loss to the St. Louis Cardinals.
August 19 - In his final major league season, outfielder Jimmie Foxx makes his debut as a pitcher. He pitches seven innings, giving up just four hits as the Phillies defeated the Cincinnati Reds 4–2. 
August 28 - Seventeen year old Tommy Brown of the Brooklyn Dodgers hits a triple off Rene Monteagudo of the Philadelphia Phillies. Brown then takes advantage of Monteagudo's wide-up to steal home. Brown became the youngest player in major league history to steal home plate. The Dodgers defeated the Phillies 7–1.
September 1- Vince DiMaggio of Philadelphia ties a major league mark with his fourth grand slam of the season. The Phillies defeated the Braves 8–3. 
September 8 - In a contest between the Washington Senators and St. Louis Browns, Harry Truman, sworn in back in April after the death of FDR, becomes the first left hander and oldest president to ever throw out a ceremonial pitch. Washington defeated St. Louis 4–1.
September 9 – Cleveland Indians first baseman Mickey Rocco leads the way to a doubleheader sweep of the New York Yankees with two home runs, two doubles, and two singles.  A crowd of 72,252 is on hand at Yankee Stadium to see their team lose 10-3 and 4–3.
September 9 – In the second game of a doubleheader, Dick Fowler pitches a no-hitter as the Philadelphia Athletics defeat the St. Louis Browns, 1–0.
September 13 - The Cincinnati Reds defeat the New York Giants 3–2. There were only 281 fans in attendance, making it the smallest crowd to see a game at Crosley Field. 
September 29 – Chicago Cubs catcher Paul Gillespie homers in his final major league at bat.  In 1942 he homered in his first major league at bat. He was the first player in MLB history to do both. John Miller was the second, in 1966 and 1969.

October–December
October 6 - Attempting to promote his pub, the Billy Goat Tavern, William Sanis purchases a ticket to game 4 of the world series. He attempts to bring his Billy Goat, Murphy, into the stadium but is turned away by the ushers. Sanis is so angered that vows to place a curse on the team, ensuring they'd never win another World Series. This became part of Cubs fork lore, known as the curse of the Billy Goat. 
October 10 – The Detroit Tigers defeat the Chicago Cubs, 9–3, in Game 7 of the World Series to win their second World Series, four games to three. Chicago's next trip to the World Series occurred on 22 October 2016. 
October 23 – Jackie Robinson is signed by the Dodgers; he is later assigned to the Montreal Royals for the 1946 season.
December 14 - The Cleveland Indians traded outfielder Jeff Heath, who'd led the team in home runs, to the Washington Senators for George Case.

Date unknown
The Mexican Winter League is born with the name Liga Invernal de Sonora

Births

January
January 3 – Larry Barnett
January 7 – Tony Conigliaro
January 8 – Jesús Hernáiz
January 12 – Paul Gilliford
January 12 – Bob Reed
January 18 – Tom Harrison
January 18 – Rich Severson
January 20 – Dave Boswell
January 22 – Jophery Brown
January 25 – Wally Bunker
January 29 – Dick Mills

February
February 9 – Jim Nash
February 11 – John Paciorek
February 12 – Don Wilson
February 14 – Bob Terlecki
February 15 – Ross Moschitto
February 21 – Tom Shopay
February 24 – Gary Moore
February 26 – Steve Hertz

March
March 1 – Jim Panther
March 5 – Dave Bakenhaster
March 11 – Dock Ellis
March 12 – Don O'Riley
March 12 – Horacio Piña
March 25 – Jim Ellis
March 30 – Dick Woodson

April
April 2 – Mike Kekich
April 2 – Reggie Smith
April 2 – Don Sutton
April 4 – Nick Bremigan
April 9 – Jerry Hinsley
April 11 – Mike Kilkenny
April 15 – Ted Sizemore
April 17 – Dennis Paepke
April 18 – Mike Paul
April 19 – Tommy Gramly
April 23 – Jorge Rubio
April 30 – Ray Miller

May
May 3 – Davey Lopes
May 4 – Rene Lachemann
May 5 – Jimmy Rosario
May 25 – Bill Dillman
May 26 – Al Yates
May 29 – Clyde Mashore
May 29 – Blue Moon Odom

June
June 5 – Chip Coulter
June 6 – Larry Howard
June 7 – George Mitterwald
June 12 – Gary Jones
June 20 – Ray Newman
June 25 – Dick Drago
June 30 – Jerry Kenney
June 30 – Otis Thornton

July
July 1 – Billy Rohr
July 2 – Ron Slocum
July 7 – Chuck Goggin
July 7 – Bill Melton
July 8 – Jim Ollom
July 10 – Hal McRae
July 17 – Greg Riddoch
July 29 – Roy Foster

August
August 4 – Mike Davison
August 6 – Andy Messersmith
August 15 – Duffy Dyer
August 15 – Bobby Treviño
August 16 – Jan Dukes
August 21 – Jerry DaVanon
August 30 – Tommy Dean

September
September 8 – Ossie Blanco
September 13 – Rick Wise
September 14 – Curtis Brown
September 16 – Bob Chlupsa
September 16 – Ed Sprague
September 16 – Héctor Torres
September 20 – Mike Jurewicz
September 25 – Steve Arlin
September 25 – Bill Hepler
September 26 – Dave Duncan
September 28 – Gene Ratliff

October
October 1 – Rod Carew
October 4 – John Duffie
October 7 – Dick Bates
October 11 – Bob Stinson
October 12 – Herman Hill
October 14 – Tom Silverio
October 15 – Jim Palmer
October 17 – Bob Christian
October 18 – Don Young
October 19 – Al Gallagher
October 19 – Gary Taylor
October 27 – Mike Lum
October 30 – Roe Skidmore

November
November 1 – Bobby Brooks
November 3 – Ken Holtzman
November 3 – Jim Johnson
November 7 – Dave Bennett
November 10 – Bill Southworth
November 12 – Rafael Batista
November 17 – Bill Harrelson
November 19 – Bobby Tolan
November 20 – Jay Johnstone
November 20 – Rick Monday
November 20 – John Sanders
November 22 – Denny Riddleberger
November 25 – Wayne Redmond

December
December 3 – Steve Huntz
December 3 – Lou Marone
December 6 – Larry Bowa
December 6 – Jay Dahl
December 12 – Ralph Garr
December 14 – Greg Goossen
December 15 – Gil Blanco
December 19 – Art Kusnyer
December 19 – Geoff Zahn
December 20 – Vince Colbert
December 20 – Keith Lampard
December 30 – Tom Murphy

Deaths

January
January   3 – George Stone, 68, left fielder for the Boston Americans and St. Louis Browns during seven seasons spanning 1903–1910, who led the American League in his 1905 rookie season with 187 hits, and topped the league in 1906 with a .358 batting average, total bases (291), on-base percentage (.417) and slugging percentage (.501), while finishing second in hits (208) and triples (20), third in RBI (71), and seventh in home runs (6).
January   5 – Bill Hobbs, shortstop who played with the Cincinnati Reds in the 1913 and 1916 seasons.
January 11 – Harry McNeal, 67, pitcher for the 1901 Cleveland Bluebirds of the American League.
January 14 – Ted Blankenship, 43, a hard throwing pitcher who played from 1922 through 1930 for the Chicago White Sox.
January 17 – Roy Radebaugh, 63, pitcher for the St. Louis Cardinals in the 1911 season.
January 17 – Rube Ward, 65, backup outfielder for the 1902 Brooklyn Superbas of the National League.
January 18 – Mike Fitzgerald, 53, outfielder who played for the New York Highlanders in 1911 and the Philadelphia Phillies in 1918.
January 18 – Gene Lansing, 47, pitcher who played briefly for the 1922 Boston Braves of the National League.

February
February   1 – Tubby Spencer, 61, backup catcher who played for the St. Louis Browns, Boston Red Sox, Philadelphia Phillies and Detroit Tigers in all or parts of nine seasons spanning 1905–1918.
February 11 – Ham Iburg, 71, pitcher for the Philadelphia Phillies in 1902, who later posted three 20-win consecutive seasons at the Pacific Coast League from 1903 to 1905.  
February 13 – Jocko Halligan, 76, backup outfielder who played from 1890 through 1892 in the National League for the Baltimore Orioles, Cincinnati Reds and Buffalo Bisons.
February 14 – Jim Curtiss, 83, outfielder who divided his playing time between the Cincinnati Reds and the Washington Statesmen from 1891 to 1892.
February 15 – Steve Behel, 84, backup outfielder who played with the Milwaukee Brewers of the Union Association in 1884 and for the New York Metropolitans of the American Association in 1886. 
February 18 – John Munyan, 84, catcher who played for the Cleveland Blues, Columbus Solons and St. Louis Browns of the National League in a span of three seasons from 1887 to 1891.
February 20 – Charlie Heard, 73, pitcher and outfielder who played for the Pittsburgh Alleghenys of the National League during the 1890 season.
February 21 – Paul Radford, 83, outfielder and shortstop for nine different teams in a 12-season career from 1883 to 1894, who collected 1206 hits and 346 stolen bases in 1361 games, while being a member of the 1884 World Champion Providence Grays and three pennant-winning teams.

March
March   6 – Harry O'Neill, 27, catcher for the 1939 Philadelphia Athletics, whose name is linked forever to that of Elmer Gedeon as the only two major leaguers that were killed during World War II.
March 11 – Sam Mertes, 72, left fielder for five clubs in 10 seasons spanning 1896–1906, who was a member of the 1905 World Champions New York Giants and led the National League with 32 doubles and 104 RBI in 1903.
March 29 – Ray Tift, 60, pitcher for the 1907 New York Highlanders of the American League.
March 29 – Jim Hughey, 76, pitcher who played for the Milwaukee Brewers, Chicago Colts, St. Louis Browns, Cleveland Spiders and St. Louis Cardinals in a span of seven seasons from 1891 to 1900.

April
April   4 – Dick Cotter, 55, catcher who played from 1911 to 1912 for the Philadelphia Phillies and Chicago Cubs.
April   9 – Ted Cather, 55, outfielder who played from 1912 through 1915 for the St. Louis Cardinals and Boston Braves, as well as a member of the 1914 World Champion Cardinals Team.
April 13 – Joe Kutina, 60, first baseman who played in 1911 and 1912 with the St. Louis Browns of the American League.
April 16 – Chick Fewster, 49, second baseman who played from 1917 through 1927 for the New York Yankees, Boston Red Sox, Cleveland Indians and Brooklyn Robins, perhaps best known for being one of those involved in one of the most famous flubs in MLB history, the three men on third incident occurred in the 1926 season.
April 25 – Jim Murray, 67, outfielder who played for the Chicago Orphans, St. Louis Browns and Boston Braves in parts of three seasons spanning 1902–1914.

May
May   2 – Joe Corbett, 69, pitcher who played for the Washington Senators, Baltimore Orioles and St. Louis Cardinals National League clubs during four seasons between 1895 and 1904.
May   3 – Bill Stemmyer, 79, fireball pitcher for the Boston Beaneaters and Cleveland Blues from 1885 to 1898, who in 1886 led the National League in SO/9IP (6.17), but threw 63 wild pitches which is still the highest single-season total in MLB history.
May   6 – Eddie Zimmerman, 62, third baseman who played for with the St. Louis Cardinals in 1906 and for the 1911 Brooklyn Dodgers in 1911.
May 18 – Pete Cregan, 70, backup outfielder for the 1899 New York Giants and the 1903 Cincinnati Reds.
May 22 – Jake Atz, 65, middle infielder who played with the Washington Senators in 1902 and Chicago White Sox from 1907 to 1909; spent 27 years as a minor-league manager, winning six consecutive Texas League pennants with the Fort Worth Panthers from 1920 to 1925.  
May 25 – Charlie Frye, 30, pitcher for the 1940 Philadelphia Phillies.
May 27 – Walter Carlisle, 63, English left fielder for the 1908 Boston Red Sox, who entered the records books as the only outfielder ever to make an unassisted triple play in organized baseball, while playing for the 1911 Vernon Tigers of the Pacific Coast League.

June
June   5 – Fred Lewis, 86, outfielder who played from 1881 through 1886 for the Boston Red Caps, Philadelphia Quakers, St. Louis Browns, St. Louis Maroons, and Cincinnati Red Stockings National League clubs.
June   8 – Bill Kemmer, 71, third baseman for the 1895 Louisville Colonels of the National League.
June 17 – Joe Visner, 85, catcher and outfielder who played with the Baltimore Orioles, Brooklyn Bridegrooms, Pittsburgh Burghers, Washington Statesmen and St. Louis Browns in a span of four seasons from 1885 to 1891, being also a member of the Brooklyn club that won the 1889 American Association pennant title.
June 18 – Sid Mercer, 64, Hall of Fame sportswriter who covered mostly boxing and baseball in St. Louis, Missouri and in New York City, and also served as an official with the St. Louis Browns from 1903 through 1905.
June 19 – Bob Gandy, 51, outfielder for the 1916 Philadelphia Phillies.
June 25 – Jack Mercer, 56, pitcher who played for the Pittsburgh Pirates in 1910.
June 29 – Clarence Winters, 45, pitcher who made four mound appearances for the 1924 Boston Red Sox.

July
July   2 – Frank Grube, 40, catcher who played in 394 games from 1931 through 1936 and in 1941 for the Chicago White Sox and St. Louis Browns.
July   7 – Ollie Anderson, 65, who spent almost 40 years as a minor-league umpire, and officiated in 152 games for the 1914 Federal League, then considered an "outlaw" circuit now thought of as a major league.
July   7 – Cal Crum, 55, pitcher who played for the Boston Braves in the 1917 and 1918 seasons.
July 10 – Bill Barnes, 87, outfielder who played in 1887 for the St. Paul Saints of the Union Association.
July 16 – Tuck Turner, 72, outfielder who played from 1893 through 1898 for the Philadelphia Phillies and St. Louis Browns of the National League, a .320 career hitter who accomplished a rare feat by hitting an inside-the-park grand slam in 1897, whose .418 batting average posted in 1894 is ninth all-time for a single-season in MLB history, as well as the highest for a switch hitter.
July 18 – Frank Butler, 85, backup outfielder for the 1895 New York Giants.
July 31 – Snapper Kennedy, 66, outfielder who played in 1902 with the Chicago Orphans of the National League.

August
August   7 – Bobby Veach, 57, left fielder for the Detroit Tigers who batted .310 lifetime, while leading the American League in RBI three times and in doubles twice.
August   9 – Art Nichols, 74, catcher, first baseman and outfielder who played from 1898 through 1903 for the Chicago Orphans and the St. Louis Cardinals.
August 14 – Tommy Clarke, 57, a fine defensive catcher who spent ten years from 1909 to 1918 for the Cincinnati Reds and Chicago Cubs, and also served as a coach on the 1933 World Championship Giants team.

September
September   4 – William Fischer, 54, catcher for the Brooklyn Dodgers/Robins, Chicago Whales, Chicago Cubs and Pittsburgh Pirates during five seasons from 1913 to 1917, who led the Whales to the 1915 Federal League pennant.
September 12 – Cy Pieh, 58, pitcher who played from 1913 to 1915 with the New York Yankees.
September 12 – Dave Zearfoss, 77, backup catcher for the New York Giants and St. Louis Cardinals in parts of five seasons spanning 1896–1905.
September 13 – Cy Blanton, 37, All-Star pitcher and one of the mainstays of the Pittsburgh Pirates rotation in the 1930s, who won 18 games and led the National League in earned run average (2.58) and shutouts (4) in his 1935 rookie season, while  leading again the league in shutouts in 1936 (4) and starts in 1937 (34).
September 18 – Ducky Holmes, 63, fine outfielder and smart base runner for seven different teams from 1895 through 1905, who posted a .281 career average and stole 236 bases in 933 games, and also managed 13 seasons in the Minor Leagues.
September 21 – Bert Humphries, 64, pitcher who played from 1910 through 1915 for the Cincinnati Reds, Chicago Cubs and Philadelphia Phillies.
September 27 – Lou Nordyke, 69, first baseman who played for the St. Louis Browns of the American League in 1906.
September 29 – George Van Haltren, 79, center fielder, primarily with the New York Giants, who hit a .316 lifetime average and ranked sixth all-time in both hits (2500+) and runs upon retirement; led the National League in triples and stolen bases once each, and also won 40 games as pitcher, including a six-inning no-hitter.

October
October   9 – Bob Ganley, 70, outfielder who played from 1905 through 1909 for the Pittsburgh Pirates, Washington Senators and Philadelphia Athletics.
October 12 – Henry Oxley, 87, a Canadian catcher who played in 1884 with the New York Gothams and the New York Metropolitans.
October 14 – Fred Tyler, 53, catcher for the 1914 Boston Braves.
October 16 – Hack Eibel, 51, outfielder and pitcher who played in 1912 with the Cleveland Naps and for the Boston Red Sox in 1920.
October 18 – Monty Pfyl, 59, first baseman for the New York Giants in the 1907 season.
October 25 – Ernie Baker, 70, pitcher for the 1905 Cincinnati Reds.
October 26 – Ernie Gust, 57, first baseman who played in 1911 for the St. Louis Browns of the American League.
October 27 – Jack Hannifin, 62, infielder who played for the Philadelphia Athletics, New York Giants and Boston Doves in a span of three seasons from 1906 through 1908.
October 27 – Taylor Shafer, 79, second baseman and outfielder who divided his playing time between the Altoona Mountain City, Kansas City Cowboys and Baltimore Monumentals of the Union Association in 1883, and later played for the Philadelphia Athletics of the National League in 1890.

November
November   1 – George Hale, 51, backup catcher for the St. Louis Browns in four seasons from 1914 to 1918.
November   3 – Mike Smith, 77, left fielder and pitcher who posted a .310 career batting average and a 75-57 pitching record with six teams from 1886 through 1901, while leading the American Association pitchers with a 2.94 ERA in 1887.
November 16 – Jake Northrop, pitcher for the Boston Braves from 1918 to 1919.
November 18 – Morrie Rath, 58, speedy and skilled second baseman for four teams in a span of six years from 1909 to 1920, who led both the American and National Leagues in fielding percentage, putouts, assists and double plays, and also was a member of the 1919 World Champion Cincinnati Reds.
November 22 – Dick Carroll, 61, pitcher for the 1909 New York Highlanders of the American League.
November 25 – Ham Patterson, 68, first baseman and outfielder who played for the St. Louis Browns and the Chicago White Sox during the 1909 season.

December
December   3 – Bill Kay, 67, outfielder who played in 1907 for the Washington Senators of the American League.
December   8 – Henry Fournier, 80,  pitcher for the 1894 Cincinnati Reds.
December 14 – Connie Murphy, 75, catcher who played from 1893 to 1894 for the Cincinnati Reds.
December 15 – Tom Hess, 70, catcher for the 1892 Baltimore Orioles of the National League.
December 22 – Bill Crouch, 59, pitcher who played in 1910 with the St. Louis Browns of the American League.
December 24 – Hughie Miller, 59, first baseman who played with the Philadelphia Phillies in 1911 and from 1914 to 1915 for the St. Louis Terriers of the Federal League.
December 26 – Frank Lange, 62,  pitcher for the 1910 Chicago White Sox.
December 27 – Gene Cocreham, pitcher who played from 1897 to 1898 for the Washington Senators of the National League.
December 27 – Hugh Fullerton, 72, Chicago sportswriter who helped break the story of the Black Sox Scandal and, as an early advocate of the value of baseball statistics, gained wide attention for correctly predicting the White Sox' upset of the Cubs in the 1906 World Series, even getting right the winner of each game and the day of a rainout.
December 27 – Cy Swaim, 71, pitcher who played with the Washington Senators of the National League in the 1897 and 1898 seasons.

Sources

External links

Baseball Reference – 1945 MLB Season Summary 
Baseball Reference – MLB Players born in 1945
Baseball Reference – MLB Players died in 1945